Nevin Stewart Scrimshaw (January 20, 1918 – February 8, 2013) was an American food scientist and Institute Professor emeritus at the Massachusetts Institute of Technology. Scrimshaw was born in Milwaukee, Wisconsin. During the course of his long career he developed nutritional supplements for alleviating protein, iodine, and iron deficiencies in the developing world. His pioneering and extensive publications in the area of human nutrition and food science include over 20 books and monographs and hundreds of scholarly articles. Scrimshaw also founded the Department of Nutrition and Food Science at the Massachusetts Institute of Technology,  the Institute of Nutrition of Central America and Panama, and the Nevin Scrimshaw International Nutrition Foundation. He was awarded the Bolton L. Corson Medal in 1976 and the World Food Prize in 1991. Scrimshaw spent the last years of his life on a farm in Thornton, New Hampshire, where he died at 95.

Life
Scrimshaw came from New England, and spent the 1930s and 1940s there studying nutrition, especially protein combining, alongside his wife and fellow scientist, Mary Goodrich. In the 1950s and 1960s, they lived in Guatemala and India. They designed meals using local vegetables to fight against the scourge of kwashiorkor. In Guatemala they used the combination of cottonseed flour with maize, while in India they combined peanut flour with wheat. His daughter is medical anthropologist and academic administrator Susan C. Scrimshaw.

Works
 1968: (with John Everett Gordon) Malnutrition, learning and behavior, MIT Press
 1968: (with Carl E. Taylor and John Everett Gordon) Interactions of nutrition and infection, World Health Organization Monograph #57
 1971: (with Alan Berg & David L. Call) Nutrition, national planning and development, MIT Press
 1971: (editor with Aaron M. Altschul) Amino acid fortification of protein foods, MIT Press
 1974: (editor with Moises Behar) Nutrition and agricultural development: significance and potential for the tropics, Institute of Nutrition of Central America and Panama, Plenum Press
 1975: (with Max Milner & Daniel I. C. Wang) Protein resources and technology, Avi Publishing
 1982: (with Mitchel B. Wallerstein) Nutrition policy implementation: issues and experience, Plenum Press

Awards and honours
 American Medical Association/Joseph B. Goldberger Award in Clinical Nutrition, 1969
 Institute of Food Technologists Bor S. Luh International Award, 1969 (known then as the IFT International Award)
 member, National Academy of Sciences, 1971
 American Society for Nutrition/Conrad Elvehjem Award for Public Service in Nutrition, 1976
Bolton S. Corson Medal, 1976 
 Fellow of the American Institute of Nutrition, 1985
 Bristol-Myers Award for Distinguished Achievements in Nutrition Research, 1988
 World Food Prize, 1991

References

Further reading
 Chandler, David L. (February 11, 2013). "Nevin S. Scrimshaw, pioneer in nutrition research, dies at 95". MIT News Office. Retrieved 11 February 2013
 Baker, Billy (January 28, 2008). "At 90, he lives the lifestyle he preaches". Boston Globe. Retrieved 29 May 2012 
 Keusch, Gerald T. (January 1, 2003). "The history of nutrition: Malnutrition, infection and immunity". The Journal of Nutrition. Retrieved 29 May 2012 
 Bhargava, Alok (July, 2013) "Nelvin S. Scrimshaw (1918 – 2003) : Remembrances" Economics and Human Biology 11(3):403,4

External links
Works by and about Nevin S. Scrimshaw on WorldCat

1918 births
2013 deaths
American food scientists
Harvard University alumni
Massachusetts Institute of Technology School of Science faculty
Tufts University faculty
People from Massachusetts
Scientists from Milwaukee
People from New York (state)
Academic staff of United Nations University
University of Rochester alumni
Members of the United States National Academy of Sciences
Auxologists
People from Thornton, New Hampshire
Agriculture and food award winners
Members of the National Academy of Medicine